Acacia pruinocarpa, commonly known as black gidgee, gidgee or tawu, is a tree in the family Fabaceae that is endemic to arid parts of Australia.

Description
Like most Acacia species, it has phyllodes rather than true leaves. The phyllodes have a linear to linear-elliptic shape with a prominent midrib and marginal nerves. It blooms between October and December and produces flowers that are yellow and held in cylindrical clusters.

Taxonomy
The species was first formally described by the botanist Mary Tindale in 1968 as part of R.H. Anderson and Tindale's work Notes on Australian taxa of Acacia as published in Contributions from the New South Wales National Herbarium. It was reclassified as Racosperma pruinocarpum by Leslie Pedley in 2003 then transferred back into the genus Acacia in 2006. The species is often confused with, and misidentified as Acacia notabilis.

Distribution
It is native throughout the arid centre of Australia, from Carnarvon, Western Australia, east to the Tanami Desert, Northern Territory and Mann Range, South Australia. It is especially common along watercourses and in low-lying areas that receive drainage. The tree is found in many types of habitat usually in stony sand or loamy soils and is associated with Acacia aneura and spinifex communities.

See also
List of Acacia species

References

External links

NT Flora: Acacia pruinocarpa. Northern Territory Government.
 Acacia pruinocarpa (Google Images)

Flora of the Northern Territory
Flora of South Australia
Acacias of Western Australia
pruinocarpa
Fabales of Australia
Trees of Australia
Plants described in 1968
Taxa named by Mary Tindale